Chinchilla is a heavy metal band from Germany. The group was founded by guitarist Udo Gerstenmeyer in 1988, and released an EP entitled No Mercy in 1990. This incarnation of the band broke up just after the release of the album, but Gerstenmeyer reformed the band in 1994 and recorded a second EP. A full-length did not appear until 1998, after which the group signed to Metal Blade Records, for whom they would release several albums. Several line-up changes have occurred over the life of the band.

Discography
No Mercy EP (1990)
Who Is Who EP (1994)
Horrorscope (1998)
Madness (Metal Blade, 2001)
2000 Years at the War (Metal Blade, 2002)
The Last Millennium (Metal Blade, 2002)
Madtropolis (Metal Blade, 2003)
Take No Prisoners (Armageddon Records, 2004)

Members

Current members
Udo Gerstenmeyer : Guitar, Keyboard
Thomas Laasch : Vocals (2000 – present)
Christian Schwinn : Drums (2003 – present)
Roberto Palacios : Bass (2004 – present)

Former Members
Martin Obermeyer : Vocals (? – 1998)
Marc Peters : Bass (? – 2002)
Steffen Theurer : Drums (? – 2002)
Marc Steck : Keyboard (2002)
Josch Häberle : Bass (2003)
Arthur Diessner : Keyboards (2003)
Ralf Stoney : Guitar (2007–2008)

References

Musical groups established in 1988
German power metal musical groups
Metal Blade Records artists